The Coburg Historic District is a National Historic District located in the city of Coburg, Oregon, United States. The district is roughly bounded by Van Duyn Road, Diamond and Miller streets, Dixon Street and Tax lots 1700 and 201, and Bottom Loop Road.

The district was placed on the National Register of Historic Places in 1986. The period of significance of the district dates back to 1875.

References

External links 

Information on historic homes from the City of Coburg website

National Register of Historic Places in Lane County, Oregon
Historic districts on the National Register of Historic Places in Oregon
1986 establishments in Oregon